Chris Evert defeated Evonne Goolagong in the final, 5–7, 6–4, 6–2 to win the women's singles tennis title at the 1975 US Open. It was her first US Open title, following four consecutive semifinal finishes at the tournament, and her fourth major singles title overall.

Billie Jean King was the reigning champion, but did not compete this year.

This was the first edition of the tournament to be played on clay courts, having previously been held on grass. However, it would change surfaces again, to hardcourt, just three years later in 1978.

Seeds
The seeded players are listed below. Chris Evert is the champion; others show the round in which they were eliminated.

 Chris Evert (champion)
 Virginia Wade (semifinalist)
 Martina Navratilova (semifinalist)
 Evonne Goolagong (finalist)
 Margaret Court (quarterfinalist)
 Olga Morozova (second round)
 Françoise Dürr (second round)
 Julie Heldman (second round)

Draw

Key
 Q = Qualifier
 WC = Wild card
 LL = Lucky loser
 r = Retired

Final eight

Earlier rounds

Section 1

Section 2

Section 3

Section 4

See also
 Evert–Navratilova rivalry

External links
1975 US Open – Women's draws and results at the International Tennis Federation

Women's Singles
US Open (tennis) by year – Women's singles
1975 in women's tennis
1975 in American women's sports